Yerry Paulino De Los Santos (born December 12, 1997) is a Dominican professional baseball pitcher for the Pittsburgh Pirates of Major League Baseball (MLB). He made his MLB debut in 2022.

Career 
De Los Santos signed with the Pittsburgh Pirates organization in 2014 for $100,000 as an international free agent from the Dominican Republic. After a year of pitching in the Pirates organization. he had Tommy John surgery and missed the 2016 minor league season.

On April 13, 2022, De Los Santos combined with Chase De Jong and Austin Brice to throw a no-hitter for the Indianapolis Indians of the Triple-A International League. On May 22, 2022, the Pirates selected De Los Santos's contract, promoting him to the major leagues for the first time. He made his MLB debut on May 25.

See also
 List of Major League Baseball players from the Dominican Republic

References

External links

Living people
1997 births
People from Samaná Province
Major League Baseball players from the Dominican Republic
Major League Baseball pitchers
Pittsburgh Pirates players
Greensboro Grasshoppers players
Altoona Curve players
Indianapolis Indians players
Bristol Pirates players
Gulf Coast Pirates players
Dominican Summer League Pirates players
Gigantes del Cibao players